Slugfest may refer to:
 Slugfest, a baseball term for a high scoring game
 SlugFest, a pinball-like coin-op game produced by Williams
 "Slugfest" (Camp Lazlo) television series episode
 Ken Griffey, Jr.'s Slugfest, a baseball game for the Nintendo 64 and Game Boy Color
 MLB Slugfest, a baseball game released by Midway Games
 Slugfest (Transformers), the name of several fictional characters in the various Transformers universes
 Slugfest, the name for the community of MIT students living on the fourth floor of the East Parallel of the dormitory East Campus